Connecticut Community Bank, is a full-service community bank and mortgage provider serving customers in Connecticut. The bank is headquartered in Norwalk, Connecticut and was founded in 1998. The bank was founded as a result of a merger between several historic banks in Connecticut, including Darien Bank and Trust, Greenwich Bank and Trust, Norwalk Bank and Trust, Stamford Bank and Trust, Westport National Bank and Insurbanc.

Connecticut Community Bank is a member of the SUM ATM network.

Notes

External links
 Official website
 Insurbanc

Banks based in Connecticut
American companies established in 1998
Banks established in 1998
Mutual savings banks in the United States
Mortgage lenders of the United States
Companies based in Fairfield County, Connecticut
Companies based in Norwalk, Connecticut